The Pannónia-Ring is a motor and racing circuit in Ostffyasszonyfa, Hungary. It is located south of the town centre, accessible by road on the 8451.

Data about the track 

 Track length: 
 Number of right turns: 11
 Number of left turns: 7
 Track width: 
 Length of start-finish straight: 
 Max speed Pro-Superbike: approx. 
 Official record/lap: 1:53.667 (2011:  Andreas Meklau)
 High-line tumbling zones (gravel)

One of the world's safest motorcycle and car speedway circuits. The track also has a special feature: it is homologated in the opposite direction (left-hand side).

Homologation to international standards, state-of-the-art infrastructure: health station, electronic timing, petrol station, express service, tyre service, motorbike showroom, restaurant, 300 sqm main building, go-kart and supermoto track, helipad, motel, sanitary, restaurant. The pit lane has 20 boxes and the depot has 15 more.

External links 

 Official website of the circuit
 Pannónia Ring: Esőmenők – Magyar Narancs, 19 September 1996
 Pannonia Ring Gokart

Vas County
Buildings and structures in Hungary
Motorsport venues in Hungary